Landsverk L-100 (L-100) was a prototype design by AB Landsverk in 1933–34. It was designed as an ultra-light tank weighing just 4.5 tonnes. It was armed with a single machine gun, Its max speed was 55km/h. It never entered service with the Swedish army.

Landsverk L-101 was an ultra-light weight tank destroyer armed with a 20 mm Cannon. This design never got beyond the drawing board.

References
1. Tanks of the World 1915-1945 by Peter Chamberlain and Chris Ellis 1972/2002 p 160. 
2. Swedish Armor http://mailer.fsu.edu/~akirk/tanks/swe/Swedish.htm

External links
 Swedish Armor 

Tanks of Sweden
World War II tanks